Geoffrey Hendricks (July 30, 1931 in Littleton, New Hampshire – May 12, 2018) was an American artist associated with Fluxus since the mid 1960s. He was professor emeritus of art at Rutgers University, where he taught from 1956 to 2003 and was associated with Allan Kaprow, Roy Lichtenstein, and Lucas Samaras during the 1960s.

In 2002, he edited Critical Mass: Happenings, Fluxus, Performance, Intermedia and Rutgers University, 1958–1972, a book that documents the seminal creative activity and experimental work of faculty members such as Bob Watts, Allan Kaprow, George Brecht, Hendricks, and others.  

He had participated in Fluxus festivals worldwide and exhibited internationally. He was renowned by students he mentored over his 48 years of teaching, and for his skill in preparing macrobiotic meals. He maintained studios and residences in New York City and a farm in Colindale, Cape Breton Island, Nova Scotia, along with his partner and sometimes collaborator Sur Rodney (Sur). Hendricks styled himself a "cloudsmith" for his extensive work depicting skies in paintings, on objects, in installations, and in performances. 

In 2006, he had solo exhibitions at the Art Gallery of Windsor in Ontario; the Mary Porter Sesnon Art Gallery at the University of California, Santa Cruz; Galerie Esplanade, Bad Ischl, Austria; the Egon Schiele Art Centrum, Český Krumlov, Czech Republic; and taught "Artist as Nomad" at the International Summer Academy, in Salzburg, Austria. Prior to his death in May 2018, he performed "Headstands for Peace", an event organized by Julie Evanoff in Washington Square Park.

Hendricks was married from 1961 to 1971 to artist Bici Forbes (Nye Ffarrabas). Later, his partner was artist Sur Rodney (Sur).

Selected bibliography 

Hendricks, Geoffrey. Ring Piece: The journal of a twelve hour silent meditation. Something Else Press, 1973.
Hendricks. Sheep's Skeleton & Rocks. Unpublished Editions, 1977.
Hendricks, ed. Critical Mass: Happenings, Fluxus, Performance, Intermedia, and Rutgers University, 1958–1972. Rutgers University Press, 2002.

References

External links
 Archivio Conz
 Fluxus.org
 Fluxlist
 Fluxlist blog
 Fluxus Museum in Potsdam, Germany
 fluxus debris! @ art / not art
 The Fluxus Blog
 Archives of Fluxlist
Geoffrey Hendricks in the Video Data Bank
Hendricks' page on La MaMa Archives Digital Collections

1931 births
2018 deaths
Fluxus
American art curators
American artists
People from Littleton, New Hampshire
Rutgers University faculty